Nathanio Kompaoré (born 20 June 2001) is a Burkinabé footballer who plays as a forward in the Anderlecht youth system and the Burkina Faso national team.

International career
Kompaoré was first called up to the Burkina Faso senior squad in late 2017, as a part of the 25-man squad convened by manager Idrissa Malo Traoré for the 2018 African Nations Championship. At 16 years old, he was the youngest player in the competition. He made his international debut during the first group stage match against Angola on 16 January, playing the full 90 minutes of an eventual 0–0 draw. After the match, the Moroccan publication Le Matin called him a "young prodigy" and the "most talented" player on the pitch. He made two more appearances in the tournament (against Congo and Cameroon, respectively) as Burkina Faso finished third in their group, ending their campaign.

He won a gold medal with the national under-20 team at the 2019 African Games.

International statistics

Honours

Club
Salitas Ouagadougou
 Coupe du Faso: 2018
 Burkinabé SuperCup: 2018

Anderlecht
 Coupe de Belgique U21: 2022

International
Burkina Faso U20
 African Games:  2019

References

External links
 
 

Living people
2001 births
Burkinabé footballers
Burkina Faso international footballers
Association football forwards
Burkinabé Premier League players
African Games gold medalists for Burkina Faso
Competitors at the 2019 African Games
Burkinabé expatriate footballers
Burkinabé expatriate sportspeople in Belgium
Expatriate footballers in Belgium
Burkina Faso under-20 international footballers
African Games medalists in football
21st-century Burkinabé people
Burkina Faso A' international footballers
2018 African Nations Championship players
R.S.C. Anderlecht players
Salitas FC players